Paying the Price is a 1927 American silent film directed by David Selman, which stars Marjorie Bonner, Priscilla Bonner, John Miljan, and George Hackathorne. The screenplay was written by J. Grubb Alexander from a story by Dorothy Howell.

Cast list
 Marjorie Bonner as Gordon daughter
 Priscilla Bonner as Gordon daughter
 John Miljan as Michael Donovan
 George Hackathorne as Basil Payson
 Mary Carr as Mrs. Gordon
 Eddie Phillips
 William Welsh as Thomas Gordon
 William Eugene as Minister

References

External links
 
 
 

Columbia Pictures films
Films directed by David Selman
1927 drama films
1927 films
Melodrama films
Silent American drama films
American silent feature films
American black-and-white films
1920s English-language films
1920s American films